There have been five baronetcies created for persons with the surname Reid, one in the Baronetage of Nova Scotia and four in the Baronetage of the United Kingdom. As of 2019 one creation is extant.

The Reid Baronetcy, of Barra in the County of Aberdeen, was created in the Baronetage of Nova Scotia on 30 November 1703 for John Reid. The second Baronet represented Elgin Burghs in the House of Commons between 1710 and 1713. The title became extinct on the death of the seventh Baronet in 1885.

The Reid Baronetcy, of Ewell Grove in the County of Surrey and of Graystone Park in the County of Dumfries, was created in the Baronetage of the United Kingdom on 10 November 1823 for Thomas Reid. The title became extinct on the death of the fourth Baronet in 1903.

The Reid Baronetcy, of Ellon in the County of Aberdeen, was created in the Baronetage of the United Kingdom on 28 August 1897 for James Reid. He was physician to Queen Victoria, Edward VII and George V. The third Baronet served as a Deputy Lieutenant of Cambridgeshire.

The Reid Baronetcy, of Springburn in the County of the City of Glasgow and of Kilmaurs in the County of Ayr, was created in the Baronetage of the United Kingdom on 26 January 1922 for Hugh Reid. He was Chairman and Managing Director of the North British Locomotive Company. The title became extinct on the death of the third Baronet in 2012.

The Reid Baronetcy, of Rademon in the County of Down, was created in the Baronetage of the United Kingdom on 8 February 1936 for David Reid, Unionist Member of Parliament for East Down from 1918 to 1922 and for Down from 1922 to 1939. The title became extinct on his death in 1939.

Reid baronets, of Barra (1703)
Sir John Reid, 1st Baronet (died after 1722)
Sir Alexander Reid, 2nd Baronet (died 1750)
Sir James Reid, 3rd Baronet (died )
Sir John Reid, 4th Baronet (1760–1829)
Sir John Reid, 5th Baronet (1794–1844)
Sir William Reid, 6th Baronet (1795–1845)
Sir Alexander Reid, 7th Baronet (1798–1885)

Reid baronets, of Ewell Grove (1823)
Sir Thomas Reid, 1st Baronet (1762–1824)
Sir John Rae Reid, 2nd Baronet (1791–1867)
Sir John Rae Reid, 3rd Baronet (1841–1885)
Sir Henry Valentine Rae Reid, 4th Baronet (1845–1903)

Reid baronets, of Ellon (1897)
Sir James Reid, 1st Baronet (1849–1923)
Sir Edward Reid, 2nd Baronet (1901–1972)
Sir Alexander Reid, 3rd Baronet (1932–2019)
Sir Charles Edward James Reid, 4th Baronet (born 1956)

The heir apparent is the present holder's only son Marcus James Reid (born 1994).

Reid baronets, of Springburn and Kilmaurs (1922)
Sir Hugh Reid, 1st Baronet (1860–1935)
Sir Douglas Neilson Reid, 2nd Baronet (1898–1971)
Sir Hugh Reid, 3rd Baronet (1933–2012)

Reid baronets, of Rademon (1936)
Sir David Douglas Reid, 1st Baronet (1872–1939)

References

Baronetcies in the Baronetage of the United Kingdom
Extinct baronetcies in the Baronetage of Nova Scotia
Extinct baronetcies in the Baronetage of the United Kingdom
1703 establishments in Nova Scotia
1823 establishments in the United Kingdom